Andorra participated at the inaugural edition of the European Games in 2015. However, Andorra was one of the eight nations that failed to win a medal at the inaugural European Games.

Medal Tables

Medals by Games

See also
 Andorra at the Olympics

References